Demetrida is a genus of beetles in the family Carabidae, containing the following species:

 Demetrida acutangula (Fauvel, 1882)
 Demetrida aitape (Darlington, 1968)
 Demetrida angulata (Darlington, 1968)
 Demetrida aiyura (Darlington, 1971)
 Demetrida angusticollis (Macleay, 1864)
 Demetrida angustula (Chaudoir, 1872)
 Demetrida apicalis (Sloane, 1917)
 Demetrida basalis (Darlington, 1968)
 Demetrida brachinodera (Chaudoir, 1852)
 Demetrida brandti (Darlington, 1968)
 Demetrida brunnea (Darlington, 1968)
 Demetrida carteri (Sloane, 1923)
 Demetrida chaudoiri (Macleay, 1871)
 Demetrida concinna (Blackburn, 1901)
 Demetrida constricticeps (Sloane, 1898)
 Demetrida crepera (Darlington, 1968)
 Demetrida cylindricollis (Blackburn, 1901)
 Demetrida demarzi (Straneo, 1960)
 Demetrida depressa (Perroud and Montrouzier, 1864)
 Demetrida dieffenbachii (White, 1843)
 Demetrida discoidalis (Darlington, 1968)
 Demetrida diversa (Darlington, 1968)
 Demetrida divisa (Darlington, 1968)
 Demetrida dobodura (Darlington, 1968)
 Demetrida doddi (Sloane, 1917)
 Demetrida dorsalis (Darlington, 1968)
 Demetrida duplicata (Darlington, 1968)
 Demetrida elongata (Sloane, 1898)
 Demetrida fasciata (Sloane, 1915)
 Demetrida filiformis (Blackburn, 1893)
 Demetrida fumipes (Darlington, 1968)
 Demetrida genicula (Darlington, 1968)
 Demetrida goroka (Darlington, 1968)
 Demetrida grandis (Chaudoir, 1848)
 Demetrida hollandia (Darlington, 1968)
 Demetrida humeralis (Darlington, 1968)
 Demetrida imitatrix (Darlington, 1968)
 Demetrida infuscata (Chaudoir, 1872)
 Demetrida karimui (Darlington, 1971)
 Demetrida kiunga (Darlington, 1968)
 Demetrida kokoda (Darlington, 1968)
 Demetrida latangula (Darlington, 1968)
 Demetrida lateralis (Broun, 1910)
 Demetrida lepida (Darlington, 1968)
 Demetrida limbata (Fauvel, 1882)
 Demetrida lineata (Dejean, 1831)
 Demetrida lineella (White, 1846)
 Demetrida lineolata (Chaudoir, 1872)
 Demetrida longicollis (Macleay, 1864)
 Demetrida loweri (Blackburn, 1890)
 Demetrida mafulu (Darlington, 1968)
 Demetrida magna (Darlington, 1968)
 Demetrida marginipennis (Sloane, 1917)
 Demetrida metallica (Moore, 1967)
 Demetrida minor (Darlington, 1968)
 Demetrida moda (Darlington, 1968)
 Demetrida moesta (Sharp, 1878)
 Demetrida moluccensis (Darlington, 1968)
 Demetrida nasuta (White, 1846)
 Demetrida nigriceps (Darlington, 1968)
 Demetrida nigricincta (Sloane, 1910)
 Demetrida nigripennis (Darlington, 1968)
 Demetrida nigripes (Darlington, 1968)
 Demetrida nubicola (Darlington, 1968)
 Demetrida obtusangula (Fauvel, 1882)
 Demetrida pallens (Darlington, 1968)
 Demetrida pallipes (Darlington, 1968)
 Demetrida parallela (Chaudoir, 1872)
 Demetrida parena (Darlington, 1971)
 Demetrida piceola (Csiki, 1932)
 Demetrida picipennis (Chaudoir, 1872)
 Demetrida pilosula (Chaudoir, 1872)
 Demetrida prima (Darlington, 1968)
 Demetrida quadricollis (Sloane, 1917)
 Demetrida recta (Darlington, 1968)
 Demetrida reversa (Darlington, 1968)
 Demetrida rex (Darlington, 1968)
 Demetrida saidor (Darlington, 1964)
 Demetrida satelles (Blackburn, 1893)
 Demetrida sedlacekorum (Darlington, 1968)
 Demetrida seriata (Darlington, 1968)
 Demetrida seticollis (Darlington, 1968)
 Demetrida setosa (Sloane, 1920)
 Demetrida sibil (Darlington, 1968)
 Demetrida similis (Darlington, 1968)
 Demetrida sinuata (Broun, 1917)
 Demetrida spec (Darlington, 1968)
 Demetrida sublepida (Darlington, 1968)
 Demetrida submoda (Darlington, 1968)
 Demetrida subpunctata (Darlington, 1968)
 Demetrida subtenuis (Darlington, 1968)
 Demetrida suturata (Newman, 1842)
 Demetrida tenuis (Darlington, 1968)
 Demetrida tesselata (Darlington, 1968)
 Demetrida tripuncta (Darlington, 1968)
 Demetrida trivittata (Sloane, 1923)
 Demetrida truncata (Darlington, 1968)
 Demetrida tweedensis (Blackburn, 1892)
 Demetrida variabilis (Macleay, 1888)
 Demetrida variolosa (Moore, 1967)
 Demetrida velata (Darlington, 1968)
 Demetrida vigil (Darlington, 1968)
 Demetrida villosa Baehr, 1998
 Demetrida viridibasis (Darlington, 1968)
 Demetrida viridipennis (Darlington, 1968)
 Demetrida vittata (Dejean, 1831)
 Demetrida tripuncta (Darlington, 1968)
 Demetrida wau (Sloane, 1923)

References